St. Luke's Protestant Episcopal Church is a historic Episcopal church at 253 Glen Street in Sea Cliff, Nassau County, New York.

The congregation was formed in 1889, with services taking place at the old Sea Cliff Hotel.  Parishioner F. W. Geissenhainer donated land for a permanent church in 1892, with the cornerstone laid the same year.

Completed in 1894, the church building is a -story, shingled and clapboard structure with a steeply pitched slate-covered gable roof. It bears the distinctive characteristics of the Queen Anne style of architecture.

It was listed on the National Register of Historic Places in 1988.

References

External links
Official church website

Episcopal church buildings in New York (state)
Churches on the National Register of Historic Places in New York (state)
Victorian architecture in New York (state)
Churches completed in 1894
19th-century Episcopal church buildings
Churches in Nassau County, New York
National Register of Historic Places in Nassau County, New York